Lily ho can refer to:
 Lily Ho (actress) (born 1946), a former Chinese actress in Hong Kong
 Lily Ho Ngo Yee (何傲兒) (born 1988), a Chinese actress in Hong Kong